Werner Kuhn may refer to:

 Werner Kuhn (chemist), Swiss physical chemist
 Werner Kuhn (professor)
 Werner Kuhn (politician), German politician